Blount is a railway point and unincorporated place in the eponymous geographic Blount Township, Cochrane District, Ontario, Canada. It is on the Ontario Northland Railway line from Cochrane to Moosonee, between the community of Gardiner to the north and Clute railway station to the south, but is not served by Polar Bear Express passenger trains.

References

Other map sources:

Communities in Cochrane District